Edgar Miguel Lemos Pinto (born 27 August 1985) is a Portuguese cyclist, who most recently rode for UCI Continental team .

Major results

2008
 8th Clásica de Almería
2009
 4th Overall GP Internacional Paredes Rota dos Móveis
2012
 3rd Road race, National Road Championships
 9th Overall Troféu Joaquim Agostinho
2013
 2nd Overall Troféu Joaquim Agostinho
1st Points classification
 4th Overall Volta a Portugal
2014
 3rd Overall Troféu Joaquim Agostinho
1st Stage 1
 4th Overall Volta ao Alentejo
 5th Overall Volta a Portugal
1st Stage 4
 7th Overall Vuelta a Castilla y León
 10th Overall Volta ao Algarve
2015
 4th Overall Tour de Ijen
 5th Overall La Tropicale Amissa Bongo
 6th Overall Tour du Maroc
1st  Mountains classification
1st Stage 3
2016
 3rd Overall Volta Internacional Cova da Beira
2017
 7th Overall Volta ao Alentejo
 8th Clássica Aldeias do Xisto
 9th Overall Troféu Joaquim Agostinho
 10th Overall Volta ao Algarve
2018
 1st  Overall Vuelta a la Comunidad de Madrid
1st Stage 1
 1st Stage 4 Volta ao Alentejo
 4th Overall Volta a Portugal
 6th Overall GP Nacional 2 de Portugal
2019
 4th Overall Vuelta a Asturias
1st Stage 3
 5th Overall Tour of Turkey
 5th Overall Vuelta a Aragón
 5th Overall Volta a Portugal
 10th Overall Danmark Rundt

References

External links

1985 births
Living people
Portuguese male cyclists
European Games competitors for Portugal
Cyclists at the 2015 European Games